Papineau is a provincial electoral district located in the Outaouais region of Quebec, which elects members to the National Assembly. It notably includes part of the City of Gatineau as well as the municipalities of L'Ange-Gardien, Saint-André-Avellin, Thurso and Papineauville.

It was created for the 1923 election from part of Labelle.

In the change from the 2001 to the 2011 electoral map, it lost Val-des-Monts to Gatineau electoral district but gained some territory in the city of Gatineau from Chapleau electoral district.

The constituency or “riding” was named after Louis-Joseph Papineau, Canadian politician and leader of the Quebec Patriotes in the 19th century.

Members of the Legislative Assembly / National Assembly

Election results

|-

|Liberal
|Alexandre Iracà
|align="right"|12,966
|align="right"|34.76
|align="right"|-16.60
|-

|-

|-

|-

|}

|-

|Liberal
|Normand MacMillan
|align="right"|13,786
|align="right"|50.94
|align="right"|
|-

|-

|-

|-
|}

|-

|Liberal
|Normand MacMillan
|align="right"|13,559
|align="right"|39.05
|align="right"|-18.97
|-

|-

|-
|}

|-

|Liberal
|Normand MacMillan
|align="right"|17,933
|align="right"|58.02
|align="right"|+3.24
|-

|-

|-

|-
|}

|-

|Liberal
|Normand MacMillan
|align="right"|16,025
|align="right"|54.78
|align="right"|+1.11
|-

|-

|Natural Law
|Richard Lauzon
|align="right"|128
|align="right"|0.44
|align="right"|-0.19
|-

|PDS
|Patrick Aube
|align="right"|126
|align="right"|0.43
|align="right"|
|-

|-

|-
|}

|-

|Liberal
|Normand MacMillan
|align="right"|15,084
|align="right"|53.67
|align="right"|+2.99
|-

|-

|-

|Natural Law
|Claude Cote
|align="right"|178
|align="right"|0.63
|align="right"|
|-

|-
|}

|-

|Liberal
|Normand MacMillan
|align="right"|11,313
|align="right"|50.68
|align="right"|-1.50
|-

|-

|-
|}

|-

|Liberal
|Normand MacMillan
|align="right"|7,758
|align="right"|52.18
|align="right"|-6.41
|-

|-

|-

|-
|}

References

External links
Information
 Elections Quebec

Election results
 Election results (National Assembly)

Maps
 2011 map (PDF)
 2001 map (Flash)
2001–2011 changes (Flash)
1992–2001 changes (Flash)
 Electoral map of Outaouais region
 Quebec electoral map, 2011 

Politics of Gatineau
Quebec provincial electoral districts